Nephi may refer to:

Book of Mormon-related

Texts
 Book of Nephi, or the Book of Mormon
 First Nephi, the first subdivision of the Book of Mormon
 Second Nephi, the second subdivision of the Book of Mormon
 Third Nephi, the eleventh subdivision of the Book of Mormon
 Fourth Nephi, the twelfth subdivision of the Book of Mormon
 Small Plates of Nephi, part of the source material for the Book of Mormon
 Large Plates of Nephi, part of the source material of which the Book of Mormon is abridged from

Figures from the Book of Mormon
 Nephi, son of Lehi, a central figure from the Book of Mormon; founding king and prophet of the Nephites
 Nephi, son of Helaman; a Nephite missionary from the Book of Mormon
 Nephi the Disciple, son of Nephi and grandson of Helaman; a prophet from the Book of Mormon
 Nephi III, son of Nephi the Disciple from the Book of Mormon

Given name
 Nephi Anderson (1865–1923), a prominent early LDS fiction author
 Nephi Hannemann (1945-2018), actor and singer, LDS member
 Nephi Jeffs, contemporary FLDS bishop
 Nephi Jensen (1876–1955), LDS missionary, lawyer and member of the Utah House of Representatives
 Nephi Miller (1873–1940), beekeeper from Utah
 Nephi Sewell (born 1998), American football player

Places
 Lehi-Nephi, the region in the Americas first settled by Lehi and Nephi
 Nephi, Utah, a city in Juab County, Utah, United States

Other uses
 A synonym for naphtha, a flammable liquid hydrocarbon mixture
 Nephi a character in Black Sigil: Blade of the Exiled